Papilio hectorides is a species of Neotropical swallowtail butterfly from the genus Papilio that is found in Argentina, Paraguay, Uruguay and Brazil.

It is common and not threatened. Larvae feed on Piperaceae.

References

Lewis, H. L., 1974 Butterflies of the World  Page 25, figure 1(female),figure 2(male)

External links
Hector's swallowtail butterfly (Papilio hectorides), ARKive

hectorides
Butterflies described in 1794
Papilionidae of South America